Blenheim (2021 population 4,487) is a community located in south-central Chatham-Kent, Ontario, Canada.

History 
By 1783, there were French settlers in Detroit and Windsor. There were also settlers in the Niagara and Kingston region, but no real settlers to speak of in the Kent County region. In 1790, Alexander McKee negotiated Treaty #2 (McKee's Purchase) of 1790 with Pottowatomie, Wendat, Ojibwe, and Odtawa leaders in Detroit to acquire what is now Southwestern Ontario. With this area now being British controlled, settlers began moving rapidly into this new land area, and eventually, the County of Kent, and Blenheim.

Land began being surveyed in 1791 in Harwich township under the order of Lt.-Col. John Graves-Simcoe. Joining his crew was a man named Thomas Talbot who expressed great interest in this land, and Simcoe granted him any plot of land he so desired. He decided on a plot where present day Fingal resides. Being a man with substantial finances, he set out to begin road-building in Southwestern Ontario in 1800. His main road was designed to go all the way to Detroit. It consequently ran directly along a ridge of high land, and on that ridge is where present-day Blenheim stands. The great Talbot Project was suspended until the end of the War of 1812.

After the War of 1812, settlers began arriving in the area to live peaceful lives after a violent war, as did settlers who came from England after a European war with France. After timber clearing, this land was ready for farming. Blenheim itself was established in 1825-1850. It was amidst  of dense forest, and its development lagged behind other nearby settlements. Albert Robertson purchased this land, and after the real estate traded hands over a few years, Harvey Halstead, Thomas Lynch, and George Hughson were recorded as the first three lot-tenants who built homes.

This "Ten Mile Bush" was a dense Carolinian forest with wild elk, bear, wolves, and eagles inhabiting the region. When the forests were cut down for farming, the bush became a "patchwork quilt of farms" Even a minor inspection of the contemporary area reveals acres of farms still in operation, but the elk, bear, and wolves are long gone.

Some believe that Blenheim was named after Blenheim Palace in England. However, articles written by historian Dr. Fred Landon in The News Tribune dated February 7, 1934, and historian Alvin Armstrong, both recount a party at the Samuel Brundage Inn in the early days of the settlement, at which local resident Mungo Samson gave a well-received recitation of the poem "The Battle of Blenheim." This accordingly, is where the town got its name. Blenheim, Ontario had a general store by 1845. However, the town was not incorporated until 1885, some 40 years later. In 1837 James W. Little, a militia officer and land speculator of neighbouring Raleigh Township, purchased land at the intersection of Ridge Road and Communication Road, the latter planned by Lieutenant-Governor John Graves Simcoe to connect the town of Chatham with Lake Erie. The area consisted of fertile farmland noted for sugar beets, tomatoes, tobacco, and corn. Blenheim's primary resource was timber. Once the bush was cleared adequately in about 1900, farming superseded timber as the key resource of Blenheim due to the area's rich soil and ideal climate.

By 1874, Blenheim had a full list of occupants varying in professions from dentistry to carpentry. In 1866, a town hall was built, fit for a village which was ready to emerge as an important voice in Kent County. Blenheim became an official town in 1885.

In 1888, a church for the large Methodist population was built. The telephone was introduced to Blenheim in 1885 by Bell. Electricity came in 1888. A full-fledged fire department arrived in 1891. The railway arrived in 1894 and traveled through Blenheim to Windsor. The first high school was built in 1900.

As cars became increasingly popular, Blenheim paved its first street in 1920, which opened a period of enormous growth. The Prohibition gave Blenheim a chance to grow, as many men were involved in illegal rum-running operations for larger centres. In 1924, W.G. Thompson opened a grain mill for local farmers, which is still present today.

Blenheim grew through the "Starving 30s", and the "War-Torn 40s". The period of 1950 to the present time has seen Blenheim grow to a town of 4,800.

Blenheim became a part of the Municipality of Chatham-Kent during the 1998 amalgamation of Kent County and its municipalities. Up until 1988, Blenheim had its own elected officials with: a mayor, two reeves, and six councillors. The current Mayor of Chatham-Kent is Darrin Canniff. In the municipality of Chatham-Kent, Blenheim is a part of the South-Kent region which is represented by 3 councillors: Anthony Ceccacci, Mary Clare Latimer, and Trevor Thompson.

Blenheim received regional media attention in 2019 when councillor Trevor Thompson refused to remove an image of a toy car with the Confederate flag on it, which he had shared via social media.

Economy and industry 

Blenheim is rich in agricultural industries including Rol-land Farms, Platinum Produce and Thompsons Limited. Blenheim has a diverse industrial base, which is focused in Blenheim's Industrial Park and surrounding area. Major employers in the area include:

 Apollo General Contracting (60 employees), General contractor specializing in commercial and industrial construction.
 G.W. Clarke Drainage (approx 50 employees), farm drainage services
 Gincor Trailer Werx (90 employees), trailer manufacturer 
 Thompson's Limited (125 employees), processors of agricultural grain and corn products
 Hopkins Canada Inc. (formerly Mallory Inc.) (127 employees), produces snow and car wash brushes and window cleaning products
 Lakeview Greenhouses & Farm Ltd (20-40 employees), greenhouse plant growers
 Konal Engineering & Equipment Inc. (87 employees), designers, manufacturers and installers of rim metering systems
 Woodbridge Foam (42 employees), manufacturer of headrests for the automotive industry
 Joycor Inc., (30 employees) manufacturer of wood pallets and heat treated crates
 Rodger Industries (approx. 30 employees), manufacturers of quality stainless steel parts
 Resistance Welding Products (approx. 30 employees), manufacturer of resistance and spot welding products

Tourism 

Blenheim's slogan is "Experience Unique Shopping", referring to its selection of boutiques and specialty stores. In July downtown businesses offer discounts during Ontario's longest running carnival-sidewalk sale, the Cherry Festival and Sidewalk Days. The Cherry Festival includes a cherry pit spitting contest.

Another tourist attraction in Blenheim is the RM Classic Car Exhibit. A guided tour gives a close-up view of more than 50 classic automobiles from the past century. Blenheim also hosts the Father's Day weekend for the Blenheim Classics Auto-show.

Blenheim is home to two golf courses: Willow Ridge Golf & Country Club and Deer Run. You can also visit Giffin's Maple Syrup Farm. Blenheim also offers a variety of parks and trails including the Talbot Trail place. Other outdoor recreation opportunities can be found in Rondeau Provincial Park, or C.M. Wilson Conservation area.

Local restaurants and eateries in Blenheim include Wayne's Pizza and Subs, Franko's 12 Buck Pizza, Fat Jimmy'z, Home Run Burger, Venus De Milo, Frostbites Ice-cream shop, Jack's Family Restaurant, and Sandy's Family Cafe.

Tourist attractions can also found at the nearby village of Erieau. Erieau is a waterfront tourist destination, that offers fishing, beaches, restaurants, and the Bayside Brewing Pub.

With the recent expansion of the Ridge Landfill, owned by the American corporation Waste Connections, Blenheim is additionally now home to one of the largest garbage "dumps" in Canada.

Demographics 
According to the May 2001 census, the population of Blenheim was 4,780 people, compared with a resident population in the province of Ontario of 11,410,050 people.

In 2001, 16.7% of the resident population in Blenheim were 65 or over compared with 13.2% in Canada. The median age is 39.0 years compared to 37.6 for all of Canada. 48.2% were male and 51.8% were female. Children under five account for approximately 5.9% of the population. This compares with 5.8% in Ontario, and almost 5.6% for Canada overall.

In the five years between 1996 and 2001, the population of Blenheim declined by 1.9%, compared with an increase of 6.1% for Ontario as a whole.

Religion 
Protestant: 59.0%
Catholic: 26.1%
Other Christian: 3.6%
Other religions: 0%
No religious affiliation: 11.2%

Language 
English: 93.4%
French: 1.3%
French and English: 0.2%
Other: 5.1%

Immigration 
Canada-born population: 91.4%
Foreign-born population: 8.1%
Non-permanent residents: 0.5%

Education 
Blenheim's elementary and secondary schools are under the control of two school boards, the Lambton Kent District School Board and the St. Clair Catholic District School Board.

Elementary schools 
Harwich-Raleigh Public School is the "rural" public school. It offers Junior Kindergarten to Grade 8. H.R.P.S offers both English and French Immersion programs. H.R.P.S is home of the Wildcats and its school colours are red and white. The motto of the school is: "live to learn, learn to live". 
St. Anne Catholic School serves the rural community and the town. It offers Junior Kindergarten to Grade 8. St.Anne's offers both English and French Immersion programs. St.Anne's is home to the Stars. 
W.J Baird is the in-town public school and offers Junior Kindergarten to Grade 8. "Baird" as it is known is home to the Griffins. Its school colours are green and white.

Secondary school 
Blenheim District High School is the public high school in the town and is the heart and centre of a lot of community events. B.D.H.S is home of the Blenheim Bobcats, and their colours are Black and Gold (yellow). The population of the school has declined in recent year and is currently under 500 students. The population decline is due to declining populations trend in Chatham-Kent. As well, the decline can be attributed to the loss of students from H.R.P.S, who half of which now attend Chatham-Kent Secondary School because of the Lambton-Kent District School Board's unwillingness to put a French Immersion program in the Blenheim High School, resulting in students to have to choose between staying in Blenheim or continuing to pursue French immersion.
B.D.H.S. offers a variety of Clubs and Athletics including: Student Union, Sears Drama, Musicals, Redfeather events, Volleyball, Basketball, Football, Cross-Country, Golf, Tennis, Curling, Rugby, Track & Field, and Badminton.

Media 
Blenheim News Tribune: A weekly newspaper published every Wednesday.

Sports 

Blenheim is home to a strong sports community. It is known for its high school sports teams from Blenheim District High School, which are particularly known for their football and rugby programs. The most popular sports team in Blenheim is the ice hockey team the Blenheim Blades.

Blenheim also offers a variety of minor and competitive sports including:
 Minor hockey: South Kent Lightning, the South Kent Lightning was formed by the enthusiastic union of two great Communities of Blenheim and Ridgetown, who are equally rich in Hockey History and development of young people through ideals of fair play, sportsmanship and fun. 
 The minor soccer team is the Blenheim Blaze offering both house league and competitive teams within the Sun County Soccer League. 
 Blenheim Golden Eagles Gymnastics Club, which is the longest running gymnastics facility in Chatham-Kent. 
 Blenheim & District Minor Baseball Association
 The Blenheim Blast Swim Team, a strong competitive swim team
 Blenheim Golden Acres Curling Club 
 Blenheim Youth Bowling 
 Blenheim Figure Skating Club
 Dynasty Martial Arts
 Debbie Mc Gonigle's School of Dance
 Erin's Dance Club  
 There are also two golf courses in Blenheim: Willow Ridge and Deer Run.
Prominent athletes from Blenheim include hockey player Todd Warriner.

Southern Ontario Motor Speedway(South Buxton Raceway) which features a dirt track for auto racing, is located southwest of Blenheim in South Buxton Ont

Notable people 

 Frederic Lister Burk
 Charles Hefferon
 Ron Pardo  
 George Perry
 Benjamin Parkyn Richardson
 Cassandra Vasik
 Todd Warriner

References

External links 
 Blenheim Web Page

Communities in Chatham-Kent